Revolutions: Live At Wembley is the first full-length live album by Scottish alternative rock band Biffy Clyro, released on 27 June 2011 on 14th Floor Records. The album was recorded live on 4 December 2010 at the Wembley Arena date of their UK tour.

Track listing

CD/DVD

2CD/DVD

Editions
 A Standard CD/DVD edition containing 19 tracks from the Wembley concert. Bonus features include band commentary of the show and a documentary entitled 'Only Reflections' which was filmed at the 2010 T In The Park festival in Scotland.
 A 2CD/DVD * edition featuring the full extended footage and audio of the Wembley concert. This is only available from the official Biffy Clyro website.
 A Limited Editions Tinset. The tinset includes the 2CD/DVD version of the show with extended DVD footage, a programme from the 2010 UK arena tour, a double-sided A2 poster from the tour, limited edition stickers, confetti from the show and a piece of one of the band's smashed guitars (smashed in a residential street, not at the show).

Personnel
 Simon Neil – vocals, lead guitar
 James Johnston – bass, vocals
 Ben Johnston – drums, vocals
 Mike Vennart – guitar

References

2011 live albums
Biffy Clyro albums